The 2011 MLS Cup Playoffs was the sixteenth post-season tournament culminating the Major League Soccer regular season. The tournament began on October 26 with the play-in round and concluded on November 20 with the championship match. It was the first playoff series to include ten clubs, two more than the traditional eight. Six of the ten teams earned a direct bye into the conference semifinals, while the four wildcard teams played a single-elimination match to earn a berth into the conference semis. These eight clubs played in a single-elimination tournament en route to playoffs championship MLS Cup 2011, which doubles as the league championship for the 2011 MLS season altogether.

The defending MLS Cup champions were the Colorado Rapids, who beat FC Dallas 2–1 in the 2010 championship.

As the preliminary round was eliminated from the CONCACAF Champions League, both finalists directly entered 2012–13 CONCACAF Champions League Group Stage, along with the Supporters' Shield winner for the regular season and the 2011 U.S. Open Cup champion. However, none of these berths were available to the league's two Canadian teams, which instead participated in the Canadian Championship for that country's single berth in the CONCACAF Champions League.

Format 

The format for the tournament was announced on February 23, 2011. The top three clubs in each of the league's two conferences will earn the six automatic spots in the quarterfinals. The wild-card entrants, seeded seventh through tenth, will enter based upon their overall position in a single table of the league standings. The new format is assembled so that the weakest seed to qualify out of the wild-card rounds will have to play the Supporters' Shield winner. The other entrant will play the conference champion that did not win the Shield.

The playoffs will begin with the Play-in round, which will contain the wildcard seeds. The first and second-placed wildcard seeds (seventh and eight place, respectively) will host the third and fourth-placed wildcard seeds (ninth and tenth place, respectively). The winners of each play-in proper will earn a berth into the conference semifinals, or the quarterfinals, of the playoffs.

Following the play-in round, will be the conference semifinals, where the two play-in round winners will join the six clubs that earned a direct bye into this round. The conference semifinals, will be a two-legged, aggregate series, in which each team plays their opponent twice: once at home, and once away. The team with the most goals accumulated over the two-match series will win the series and qualify for the conference championship. In this round, the lowest seeded wildcard team to advance will play against the MLS Supporters' Shield winner (regular season champion). The other wildcard seed will play against either the Eastern or Western Conference regular season champion, depending on which conference champion wins the Supporters' Shield. Also in the conference semifinals, feature the conference runners-up and third-place finishes from both the Eastern and Western Conference.

The semifinal round, or the conference championship, will feature the winners from the conference semifinals. This round will be a one-legged affair, in which the higher seeded club will host the lower seed. The winner of these matches earn two berths (one from each conference) into the 2011 MLS Cup championship and a guaranteed berth in the 2012–13 CONCACAF Champions League.

The Eastern Conference and Western Conference bracket winners will meet in the MLS Cup final, which will be held at the pre-determined neutral venue. This year, the final will be held at the Home Depot Center in Carson, California, home of the Los Angeles Galaxy and Chivas USA. The MLS Cup winner will be crowned league champion for the 2011 MLS season.

Qualification 
The top three clubs from each conference, based on final point totals, will qualify for the playoffs. From among the remaining clubs, the top 4 qualify as wild cards, entering the play-in round to narrow the field to 8. The Los Angeles Galaxy were the first MLS club to qualify for the playoffs, qualifying with a 1–0 win over Colorado Rapids on September 9.

Conference standings

Eastern table

Western table

Overall standings

Tiebreakers 
 Head-to-Head (Points-per-match average)
 Overall Goal Differential
 Overall Total Goals Scored
 Tiebreakers 1–3 applied only to matches on the road
 Tiebreakers 1–3 applied only to matches at home
 Fewest team disciplinary points in the League Fair Play table
 Coin toss

If more than two clubs are tied, once a club advances through any step, the process reverts to Tiebreaker 1 among the remaining tied clubs recursively until all ties are resolved.

Bracket

Schedule 
Major League Soccer released the schedule for its playoffs on August 9, 2011.

Key

 SS = MLS Supporters' Shield winner
 E1/W1 = Eastern or Western Conference winner
 E2/W2 = Eastern or Western Conference runner-up
 E3/W3 = Eastern or Western Conference third place
 WC1 = Top wildcard seed (7th place overall)
 WC2 = Second wildcard seed (8th place overall)
 WC3 = Third wildcard seed (9th place overall)
 WC4 = Fourth wildcard seed (10th place overall)

Play-in round

Conference Semifinals

Eastern Conference

Sporting advances 4 - 0 on aggregate.

Houston advances 3 - 1 on aggregate.

Western Conference

Los Angeles advances 3 - 1 on aggregate.

RSL advances 3 - 2 on aggregate.

Conference Finals 
Host will depend on the higher seeded team. Single elimination match.

Final

Post-season statistical leaders
Note: Statistics only for post-season games.

Top scorers

Most assists

References

External links 
 Major League Soccer: MLS Cup Playoffs

2011